Mattapan station is an MBTA light rail station in Boston, Massachusetts. It is the southern terminus of the Ashmont–Mattapan High-Speed Line, part of the Red Line, and is also an important MBTA bus transfer station, with ten routes terminating there. It is located at Mattapan Square in the Mattapan neighborhood.  At the station, streetcars use a balloon loop to reverse direction back to Ashmont station. Mattapan station is fully accessible, with mini-high platforms.

History 

The Ashmont–Mattapan Line follows the right-of-way of the Dorchester and Milton Branch Railroad, which opened to Mattapan in December 1847. The line was converted to an interurban-style trolley line in the 1920s, with the final section to Mattapan opening on December 21, 1929. The stone depot building, now a restaurant, stands adjacent in Mattapan Square.

On May 5, 2006, the MBTA awarded a $6.2 million contract to replace the 1929-built station. The MBTA closed the line on June 24 to allow a new viaduct to be constructed at Ashmont station. During the closure, all stations on the line were modernized and (except for Valley Road) made handicapped accessible. The decrepit 1929-built shelter and old platforms were replaced by modern platforms with canopies; a new building for MBTA police and bus operations with a community room was built. Trolley service resumed on December 22, 2007.

In 2014, the MBTA proposed to make $500,000 in additional renovations to the station. These included upgraded shelters and heating in passenger waiting areas, pedestrian improvements, improved signage, and bicycle storage.

Transit-oriented development

As part of the first round of modernization, the MBTA began planning for mixed-use transit-oriented development (TOD) to be built on the underused station parking lot. The planned development was not built, even after a second request for proposals was issued in 2012. In July 2014, a local charter school announced plans to build a new building on the site, despite calls for a third RFP to be issued to attract TOD instead. In January 2015, after opposition from local officials about the school's $1.5 million offer, the MBTA announced it would instead issue a third RFP that March. The third RFP was issued in November 2015.

In July 2016, the MBTA Fiscal and Management Control Board selected the winner from two proposals for the property. The project was approved by the city in 2018. Financing was secured in November 2020, with construction starting shortly after for a planned 2022 completion.

Bus connections 

Mattapan serves as a major transfer station for MBTA bus operations, with nine routes converging on Mattapan Square from six directions. Six routes use the busway located on the north side of the station, while routes 28, 29, and 31 use a bus loop on the south side.
: Wakefield Avenue & Truman Parkway–Mattapan station
: Mattapan station–
: Mattapan station–
: Mattapan station–
: Mattapan station– via Cummins Highway and Roslindale Square
: Mattapan station–Forest Hills station via Morton Street
: River Street & Milton Street–Mattapan station
: –Mattapan station
: Cobbs Corner–Mattapan station

Mattapan is also the origin point for the  Mattapan– route.  The 191 is a single daily early-morning round trip, intended for use by MBTA employees but open to the general public.

References

External links 

MBTA - Mattapan
Google Maps Street View: north busway, Mattapan Square

Red Line (MBTA) stations
Railway stations in Boston
Railway stations in the United States opened in 1929
Stations along Old Colony Railroad lines
Mattapan, Boston
1929 establishments in Massachusetts